Song Ruolun, was a Chinese Confucian scholar and poet. She was one of five sisters, who all became employed as official poets at the Imperial court: Song Ruoshen (768–820), Song Ruozhao, Song Ruoxian, Song Ruolun and Song Ruoxun.

She was the daughter of the scholar Song Tingfen in Hebei and was given advanced education by her father. In 788, she and her sisters were all taken to court to be tested about their knowledge within Confucianism, History and the Classics. They excelled and each were given an office at court. They were employed as official court poets, performing their poetry at court festivities. Song and her sisters were highly respected at court, referred to by the emperor as teacher-scholars and never treated as concubines.

References 

 Lily Xiao Hong Lee, Sue Wiles: Biographical Dictionary of Chinese Women, Volume II: Tang Through Ming 618–1644

8th-century Chinese poets
9th-century Chinese poets
Chinese courtiers
8th-century Chinese women writers
9th-century Chinese women writers
Chinese women poets
8th-century Chinese women
8th-century Chinese people
9th-century Chinese women
9th-century Chinese people